The Illustrious Royal Order of Saint Ferdinand and Merit is an order of knighthood of the Kingdom of the Two Sicilies. 

It was established on 1 April 1800 by Ferdinand IV of Naples and III Sicily to reward men who performed important deeds and gave proof of loyalty to the Head of the Royal House and to the Royal Family.

Ranks and Insignia 
The Order is divided into three Ranks: 

Knights of Grand Cross, with fess, cross and plate; 
Knights Commanders, with neck ribbon and cross; 
Knights, with ribbon and cross to the buttons.

The decoration is formed by a golden round shield bearing the image of St. Ferdinand, edged by a blue-enameled round plate with the inscription "FIDEI ET MERITO", bordered by six golden rays edged by six white enameled lilies. The ribbon is blue and edged in dark red.

See also
Royal Order of Francis I
Order of Saint George and Reunion
Order of Saint Januarius
Sacred Military Constantinian Order of Saint George

External links
 Pictures of the Order

 
Awards established in 1800